This is a list of electoral results for the electoral district of Warrnambool in Victorian state elections.

Members for Warrnambool

Election results

Elections in the 1990s

Elections in the 1980s 

The two party preferred vote was not counted between the National and Liberal candidates for Warrnambool.

Elections in the 1970s

Elections in the 1960s

Elections in the 1950s

Elections in the 1940s

Elections in the 1930s

Elections in the 1920s

 Two party preferred vote was estimated.

 Two candidate preferred vote was estimated.

Elections in the 1910s

References

Victoria (Australia) state electoral results by district